The 2000 CONCACAF Men's Pre-Olympic Tournament qualification determined which five teams qualified for the 2000 CONCACAF Men's Pre-Olympic Tournament.

First round

|}

Second round

|}

Third round

Group A

Group B

Group C

References 

CONCACAF Men's Olympic Qualifying Tournament
Olympics
Football qualification for the 2000 Summer Olympics